Anemonastrum narcissiflorum, the narcissus anemone or  narcissus-flowered anemone, is a herbaceous perennial in the genus Anemonastrum and the buttercup family. Basionym: Anemone narcissiflora Hook. & Arn.

Description 

The flowers are produced in clusters (umbels) with 2 to 8 flowers, but often appear singly. The inflorescence have 3 leaf-like bracts similar in appearance to the basal leaves but simple and greatly reduced in size, pinnatifid in shape. Flowers have no petals, but instead have 5-9 petal-like sepals that are white, blue-tinted white or yellow in color. The flowers usually have 40 to 80 stamens but can have up to 100.

Distribution and habitat 
Anemonastrum narcissiflorum is native to north western North America and Eurasia where it can be found growing in high mountain alpine grasslands, in thickets, grassy meadows with moist soils, tundra, open woods, along roadsides and in pastures.

Varieties 
This species is very variable and at least 12 varieties are generally recognized with even more proposed by other authorities. The name of the species has been in dispute and some have listed it as Anemone narcissifolia but Anemone narcissiflora was proposed for conservation.

Three varieties are native to North America:
Anemone narcissiflora L. var. villosissima DC. - Alaska
Anemone narcissiflora L. var. monantha DC. - Alaska and Eastern Yukon and Northern Northwest Territories in Canada
Anemone narcissiflora L. var. zephyra (A. Nels.) Dutton & Keener – Colorado and Wyoming
The others are from Eurasia.

Gallery

References

narcissiflorum
Flora of Subarctic America
Plants described in 1753
Taxa named by Carl Linnaeus
Flora of Western Canada
Flora of the Northwestern United States
Flora without expected TNC conservation status